This is a list of films produced in Pakistan in 1990 and in the Urdu language.

1990

See also
1990 in Pakistan

External links
 Search Pakistani film - IMDB.com

1990
Pakistani
Films